Events of 1531 in the Habsburg Netherlands and Prince-bishopric of Liège.

Incumbents

Habsburg Netherlands
Monarch - Charles V, Holy Roman Emperor, King of Spain, Duke of Brabant, of Luxembourg, etc.

Regent - Mary of Hungary, from 26 September

Prince-Bishopric of Liège
Prince-Bishop - Érard de La Marck

Events
September
 26 September – Mary of Hungary appointed regent over the Habsburg Netherlands.

October
 1 October – Charles V reorganises the governing institutions of the Habsburg Netherlands, establishing three "collateral councils" as the highest government bodies: the Brussels Privy Council, Council of State, and Council of Finances.
 7 October – Edicts issued on coins, notaries, monopolies, vagrancy and poor relief, and on the printing of heretical books.

November
 19 November – Charles V issues decree reorganizing the Council of Luxembourg.

Art
 Bernard van Orley and William Dermoyen – The Battle of Pavia (tapestry, woven between 1528 and 1531)

Births
October
 25 October – Matthew Wesenbeck, jurist (d. 1586)
December
 Hendrick van Brederode, rebel commander (d. 1568)

References

1531 in the Habsburg Netherlands